The Nigerian Village Square is a website dedicated to publishing articles on issues that are primarily of interest to Nigerians, as well as comments on these articles. It was established in April 2003, and as of September 2007, it had over 4,500 registered users (known as villagers).

Site Structure 
The website is divided into two main parts, the "site" and the "square".

The site 
The "site" is the part of the website where articles are published. Such articles usually contain the opinion of the author, although occasionally news stories of significance to Nigeria may be published. The majority of articles concern Nigerian political affairs, although there are sometimes articles on Nigerian society, religion and international affairs.

The square 
The "square" is a bulletin board in which villagers may make posts. It is divided into several sections, including:

 a Main Square section, in which serious (usually political) topics are discussed;
 an  Article Comments section in which villagers may post comments on articles that have been published on the site;
 an Introduction section where new villagers can introduce themselves;
 a Lounge where less serious topics are discussed;
 a Palava Hut in which various problems can be posted, with villagers providing feedback.

Moderation of discussions tends to be relatively light; as a result, discussions in the square are usually very lively. These discussions can sometimes get very heated; frequent sources of conflict are discussions on ethnicity, race, religion and gender.

Other sections 
The Nigerian Village Square has in the past hosted podcasts featuring discussions on major issues of the day in Nigeria, as well as interviews with notable Nigerian personalities. It also (until very recently) hosted webcasts produced by Nigeria International which featured stories of the lives of Nigerians.

Popular commentators include:

Dr. Pat Utomi
Dr. Reuben Abati

External links 
 The Nigerian Village Square

Nigerian news websites